Freehold is a tram stop on the Oldham and Rochdale Line (ORL) of Greater Manchester's light-rail Metrolink system. It opened to passengers on 13 June 2012 as part of Phase 3a of the system's expansion, and is located on Block Lane in Chadderton at its boundary with Oldham in the Metropolitan Borough of Oldham, England.

Freehold tram stop serves the Cowhill and Block Lane areas of Chadderton and the adjacent Freehold area of Werneth, Oldham from which the station takes its name. The names Cowhill and Block Lane were also considered as names for the stop prior to opening, the local council finally opting for the name Freehold.  The stop is one of the newly built stops on what was the Oldham Loop Line.

Services

Services run mostly every 6 minutes on all routes.

Connecting bus routes

Freehold station is served by service 159 which stops outside the station on Block Lane. The 159 is operated by Manchester Community Transport and heads northbound to Chadderton town centre, continuing to Oldham, and runs southbound to Hollinwood, continuing to Middleton via Woodhouses, Failsworth and New Moston.

On nearby Denton Lane, Cowhill, First Greater Manchester service 415 provides a direct link to Middleton and Oldham, while the 419, operated by Manchester Community Transport also provides a link to Chadderton and Middleton plus to Ashton-under-Lyne via Hathershaw.

References

External links

LRTA Oldham Rochdale line
Metrolink stop information
Freehold area map

Tram stops in the Metropolitan Borough of Oldham
Tram stops on the East Didsbury to Rochdale line
Railway stations in Great Britain opened in 2012
Chadderton